Lee Yun-seok was a South Korean middle-distance runner. He competed in the men's 800 metres at the 1948 Summer Olympics.

References

External links
  

Year of birth missing
Possibly living people
Athletes (track and field) at the 1948 Summer Olympics
South Korean male middle-distance runners
Olympic athletes of South Korea
Place of birth missing